Jacques Thieffry (10 May 1924 in Lille – 13 July 2006) is a French former field hockey player who competed in the 1948 Summer Olympics and in the 1952 Summer Olympics.

References

External links
 

1924 births
2006 deaths
Sportspeople from Lille
French male field hockey players
Olympic field hockey players of France
Field hockey players at the 1948 Summer Olympics
Field hockey players at the 1952 Summer Olympics